Marcos Hernán Peano (born 15 October 1998) is an Argentine professional footballer who plays as a goalkeeper for Defensa y Justicia, on loan from Unión Santa Fe.

Club career
Peano played for local club 9 de Julio Freyre in his youth career, which preceded a move to Unión Santa Fe in 2010. After six years in their system, he was promoted into their first-team during 2016 when he was an unused substitute for a Copa Argentina match with Unión Aconquija and an Primera División fixture versus Racing Club. Peano made his professional debut in September 2018, featuring for sixty-three minutes of a league draw with Colón. Seven more appearances, three in the domestic league and four in the cups, occurred across the next two years for the goalkeeper.

On 10 February 2021, Peano was sent out on loan to Defensores de Belgrano of Primera B Nacional. On 29 January 2022, he then moved to Defensa y Justicia on loan until the end of the year.

International career
Peano was selected by the Argentina U17s for the 2015 FIFA U-17 World Cup in Chile. He featured in their opening two fixtures against Mexico and Germany, both ended in defeat which sealed Argentina's elimination. The U20s called up Peano for the 2016 COTIF Tournament.

Career statistics
.

References

External links

1998 births
Living people
Sportspeople from Córdoba Province, Argentina
Argentine footballers
Argentina youth international footballers
Argentina under-20 international footballers
Association football goalkeepers
Argentine Primera División players
Unión de Santa Fe footballers
Defensores de Belgrano footballers
Defensa y Justicia footballers